Kara Cook is a Labor Party politician in Queensland, Australia. She is the Councillor for the Morningside Ward in the Brisbane City Council, succeeding Shayne Sutton in a council by-election in 2018. She was previously worked as a lawyer, specialising in domestic violence law.

Political career
Kara Cook was preselected as Labor's candidate for the Morningside Ward in Brisbane City Council on 27 October 2017 after the unexpected resignation of Labor councillor Shayne Sutton. The Morningside by-election was held on 20 January 2018. Cook was elected winning 50.04% of the primary vote. The LNP obtained 36.95% of the primary vote, while The Greens obtained 11.39% of the primary vote.

References

Queensland local councillors
Labor Right politicians
Year of birth missing (living people)
Living people
Women local councillors in Australia